Dolichoprosopus sameshimai is a species of beetle in the family Cerambycidae. It was described by N. Ohbayashi in 2001. It is known from Japan. It feeds on Lithocarpus edulis.

References

Lamiini
Beetles described in 2001